Pacific Airways may refer to:

 Pacificair (Pacific Airways Corporation), an airline in the Philippines
 Pacific Airways Inc., a small airline that operates DHC-2 Beaver float planes in Ketchikan, Alaska, United States

Pacific Airlines may refer to:

 Canadian Pacific Airlines (also known as CP Air), a defunct (1942–1987) airline, later known as Canadian Airlines and now forming part of Air Canada
 Pacific Airlines an airline in Vietnam

See also
 Cathay Pacific Airways